A107 may refer to:

A107 road - ring highway in Great Britain .
 A107 - ring highway in Russian Federation . 
RFA Eddybay (A107), a ship